Michael William Fanning (born April 4, 1967) is an American politician. He is a member of the South Carolina Senate from the 17th District, serving since 2016. He is a member of the Democratic party.

References

Living people
1967 births
Democratic Party South Carolina state senators
21st-century American politicians
People from Columbia, South Carolina
University of South Carolina alumni
Wofford College alumni